Marie-Anne Pierrette Paulze Lavoisier (20 January 1758 in Montbrison, Loire, France – 10 February 1836) was a French chemist and noblewoman. Madame Lavoisier was the wife of the chemist and nobleman Antoine Lavoisier, and acted as his laboratory companion and contributed to his work. She played a pivotal role in the translation of several scientific works, and was instrumental to the standardization of the scientific method.

Biography

Her father, Jacques Paulze, worked primarily as a parliamentary lawyer and financier.  Most of his income came from running the Ferme Générale (the General Farm) which was a private corsortium of financiers who paid the French monarchy for the privilege of collecting certain taxes.  Her mother, Claudine Thoynet Paulze, died in 1761, leaving behind Marie-Anne, then aged 3, and two other sons.  After her mother's death Paulze was placed in a convent where she received her formal education.

At the age of thirteen, Paulze received a marriage proposal from the 50-year-old Count d'Amerval.   Jacques Paulze tried to object to the union, but received threats about losing his job with the Ferme Générale.  To indirectly thwart the marriage, Jacques Paulze made an offer to one of his colleagues to ask for his daughter's hand instead. This colleague was Antoine Lavoisier, a French nobleman and scientist. Lavoisier accepted the proposition, and he and Marie-Anne were married on 16 December 1771. Lavoisier was about 28, while Marie-Anne was about 13.

Lavoisier continued to work for the Ferme-Générale but in 1775 was appointed gunpowder administrator, leading the couple to settle down at the Arsenal in Paris.   Here, Lavoisier's interest in chemistry blossomed after having previously trained at the chemical laboratory of Guillaume François Rouelle, and, with the financial security provided by both his and Paulze's family, as well as his various titles and other business ventures, he was able to construct a state-of-the-art chemistry laboratory.  Paulze soon became interested in his scientific research and began to participate in her husband's laboratory work actively.

As her interest developed, she received formal training in the field from Jean Baptiste Michel Bucquet and Philippe Gingembre, both of whom were Lavoisier's colleagues at the time.  The Lavoisiers spent most of their time together in the laboratory, working as a team conducting research on many fronts.  She also assisted him by translating documents about chemistry from English to French. In fact, the majority of the research effort put forth in the laboratory was actually a joint effort between Paulze and her husband, with Paulze mainly playing the role of laboratory assistant.

French Revolution
In 1793 Lavoisier, due to his prominent position in the Ferme-Générale, was branded a traitor during the Reign of Terror by French revolutionaries. Paulze's father, another prominent Ferme-Générale member, was arrested on similar grounds.  On 28 November 1793 Lavoisier surrendered to revolutionaries and was imprisoned at Port-Libre.  Throughout his imprisonment, Paulze visited Lavoisier regularly and fought for his release.  She presented his case before Antoine Dupin, who was Lavoisier's accuser and a former member of the Ferme-Générale.  She told of her husband's accomplishments as a scientist and his importance to the nation of France.  Despite her efforts, Lavoisier was tried, convicted of treason, and executed on 8 May 1794 in Paris, at the age of 50. Jacques Paulze was also executed on the same day.

After his death, Paulze became bitter about what had happened to her husband.  She was bankrupt following the new government's confiscation of her money and property (which were eventually returned).  In addition, the new government seized all of Lavoisier's notebooks and laboratory equipment.  Despite these obstacles, Marie-Anne organized the publication of Lavoisier's final memoirs, Mémoires de Chimie, a compilation of his papers and those of his colleagues demonstrating the principles of the new chemistry.  The first volume contained work on heat and the formation of liquids, while the second dealt with the ideas of combustion, air, calcination of metals, the action of acids, and the composition of water.  In the original copy, Paulze wrote the preface and attacked revolutionaries and Lavoisier's contemporaries, whom she believed to be responsible for his death.  This preface, however, was not included in the final publication.  Nevertheless, her efforts secured her husband's legacy in the field of chemistry.

Later life

Paulze eventually remarried in 1804, following a four-year courtship and engagement to Benjamin Thompson (Count Rumford).  Rumford was one of the most well-known physicists at the time, but the marriage between the two was difficult and short-lived.   Paulze also insisted throughout her life that she retain her first husband's last name, demonstrating her undying devotion to him.  Marie died very suddenly in her home in Paris on 10 February 1836, at the age of 78. She is buried in the cemetery of Pere-Lachaise in Paris.

Contributions to chemistry

Paulze accompanied Lavoisier in his lab during the day, making entries into his lab notebooks and sketching diagrams of his experimental designs. The training she had received from the painter Jacques-Louis David allowed her to accurately and precisely draw experimental apparatuses, which ultimately helped many of Lavoisier's contemporaries to understand his methods and results.   Furthermore, she served as the editor of his reports.  Together, the Lavoisiers rebuilt the field of chemistry, which had its roots in alchemy and at the time was a convoluted science dominated by George Stahl’s theory of phlogiston.

In the eighteenth century, the idea of phlogiston (a fire-like element which is gained or released during a material's combustion) was used to describe the apparent property changes that substances exhibited when burned.  Paulze, being a master in the English, Latin, and French language, was able to translate various works about phlogiston into French for her husband to read. Perhaps her most important translation was that of Richard Kirwan's 'Essay on Phlogiston and the Constitution of Acids', which she both translated and critiqued, adding footnotes as she went along and pointing out errors in the chemistry made throughout the paper.  Despite her contributions, she was not attributed as a translator in the original work but in later editions. She also translated works by Joseph Priestley, Henry Cavendish, and others for Lavoisier's personal use. This was an invaluable service to Lavoisier, who relied on Paulze's translation of foreign works to keep abreast of current developments in chemistry.  In the case of phlogiston, it was Paulze's translation that convinced him the idea was incorrect, ultimately leading to his studies of combustion and his discovery of oxygen gas.

Paulze was also instrumental in the 1789 publication of Lavoisier's Elementary Treatise on Chemistry, which presented a unified view of chemistry as a field.  This work proved pivotal in the progression of chemistry, as it presented the idea of conservation of mass as well as a list of elements and a new system for chemical nomenclature.  Paulze contributed thirteen drawings that showed all the laboratory instrumentation and equipment used by the Lavoisiers in their experiments.  She also kept strict records of the procedures followed, lending validity to the findings Lavoisier published.

Before her death, Paulze was able to recover nearly all of Lavoisier's notebooks and chemical apparatuses, most of which survive in a collection at Cornell University, the largest of its kind outside of Europe. The year she died, a book was published, showing that Marie-Anne had a rich theological library with books which included versions of The Bible, St. Augustine's Confessions, Jacques Saurin's Discours sur la Bible, Pierre Nicole's Essais de Morale, Blaise Pascal's Lettres provinciales, Louis Bourdaloue's Sermons, Thomas à Kempis's De Imitatione Christi, etc.

 Artistic training and contributions 
Paulze began receiving artistic instruction from the painter Jacques-Louis David in later 1785 or early 1786. Not long after, probably sometime in 1787, David painted a full-length double portrait of Paulze and her husband, foregrounding the former. Paulze's artistic training enabled her not only to document and illustrate her husband's experiments and publications (she even depicted herself as a participant in two drawings of her husband's experiments) but also, for example, to paint a portrait of Benjamin Franklin, one of the many scientific thinkers that she hosted in her salons. Later Paulze's ties with David were severed due to the radical politics of the latter in the context of the French Revolution.

References

Further reading
Kawashima, Keiko "Paulze-Lavoisier, Marie-Anne-Pierrette", New Dictionnary of Scientific Biography, Noretta Koertge ed., Detroit et.al., Thomson & Gale, 8 vols, vol. 6, 2007: 44-45
Bell, Madison Smartt. Lavoisier in the Year One. New York: Atlas Books, 2005.
Borgias, Adriane P.  "Marie Anne Pierrette Paulze Lavoisier." Women in Chemistry and Physics, A Biobibliographic Sourcebook. Eds. Louise S. Grinstein, Rose K Rose, and Miriam H. Rafailovich. Connecticut: Greenwood Press, 1993: 314-319.
Crawford, Franklin.  "CU’s great treasure of science: Lavoisier collection is Mme. Lavoisier’s Achievement."  Cornell Chronicle [New York].  30 Jan. 2007.  12 Apr. 2007. 
Eagle, Cassandra T. and Sloan, Jennifer.  "Marie Anne Paulze Lavoisier: The Mother of Modern Chemistry."  The Chemical Educator 3.5 (1998): 1-18.  12 Apr. 2007 
Hoffmann, R., "Mme Lavoisier", American Scientist 90 (Jan-Feb, 2002) pp. 22–24. Bell, Madison Smartt. Lavoisier in the Year One. New York: Atlas Books, 2005.
Rayner-Canham, Geoffrey and Marelene. "Marie Anna Pierrette Paulze Lavoisier."  Women in Chemistry. Massachusetts: American Chemical Society and Chemical Heritage Foundation, 1998: 17-22.

External links
 The transcript page includes Marie Lavoisier's engraving of a gazometer, from Traité Élémentaire de Chimie''.
 Fifteen engravings by Marie-Anne Pierrette Paulze, from Traité élémentaire de chimie.
https://web.archive.org/web/20160303223209/http://xa.yimg.com/kq/groups/14858405/944536095/name/%EE%80%80lavoisier%EE%80%81.pdf

1758 births
1836 deaths
People from Montbrison, Loire
18th-century French chemists
French women chemists
French Roman Catholics
English–French translators
Latin–French translators
Burials at Père Lachaise Cemetery
18th-century French women scientists
19th-century French women scientists
19th-century translators
19th-century French chemists